Turn the Radio Off is the second full-length album by ska punk band Reel Big Fish. It was released in the U.S. in 1996 on Mojo Records.

The single "Sell Out" both received extensive radio airplay and had mainstream success during 1997. "Sell Out" also appeared on the soundtrack to the video games FIFA 2000, Aggressive Inline, and Disney's Extreme Skate Adventure. KROQ air personality Jed the Fish appears on the album cover held at gunpoint by frontman Aaron Barrett's then-girlfriend. The album has been certified gold by the Recording Industry Association of America.

Reel Big Fish later released a song titled "Turn the Radio Off" on their album We're Not Happy 'Til You're Not Happy, named after this album.

A limited press of the album was released on Vinyl on 13 May 2014. The rerelease was exclusive to Enjoy The Ride Records, with copies also being available through Hot Topic.

Track listing

Songs From Everything Sucks
Over half of the songs are re-recorded versions of songs from RBF's first album Everything Sucks:
"Cool Ending" (an acoustic version of "I'm Cool")
"Join the Club"
"I'll Never Be"
"Trendy"
"Skatanic"
"Say Ten"
"Beer"
"All I Want is More" (originally titled "Fuck Yourself")
"Snoop Dog, Baby"
"S.R." (appeared on the original pressing of Everything Sucks, but not the Mojo re-release)
Oddly, the song "Everything Sucks" was not on the album Everything Sucks and may have been written after Everything Sucks was released.  Similarly, a song titled "Turn The Radio Off" would appear on the band's 2005 album, We're Not Happy 'Til You're Not Happy. Aaron Barrett has stated that he had planned to have a song on each album named for the previously released album. He claims that this idea eventually fell apart.

Personnel

Reel Big Fish
Aaron Barrett - vocals and guitar
Grant Barry - trombone
Andrew Gonzales - drums
Scott Klopfenstein - trumpet and vocals
Dan Regan - trombone
Tavis Werts - trumpet
Matt Wong - bass

Guest Musicians
Isaiah Owens - keyboard
Monique Powell - vocals on "She Has a Girlfriend Now"
Efren Santana - saxophone
Jesse Wilder - background vocals
Kevin Globerman - background vocals
Vince Pileggi - background vocals
Michael Shaw - background vocals

Production
Jay Rifkin - producer
John Avila - producer
Slamm Andrews - engineer
Kevin Globerman - engineer
Stephen Marcussen - mastering
Patrick McDowell - A&R
Aaron Barrett - cover concept
Vince Pileggi - cover concept
Carla Yacenda - "girl with gun"
Jed the Fish - "disc jockey"
Sheryl Nields - photography
Reggie Casagrande - assistant

Notes
The album lists the song "In The Pit" under the Writer's credits section, although "In The Pit" is not on the album. This song would later appear on the Teen Beef split 7-inch with Goldfinger and later on Why Do They Rock So Hard? as "Thank You For Not Moshing" with some minor lyrical changes.
The cover of a "clean" version of the album is a blank white field with just the band's name, the name of the album and the text of the First Amendment, incorrectly identified as "Article 1" with a typographic error: "readiness of grievances".

References

External links

Turn the Radio Off at YouTube (streamed copy where licensed)

Reel Big Fish albums
1996 albums
Mojo Records albums
Albums produced by Jay Rifkin